Hugh Salkend (died c. 1440), of Rosgill, Westmorland, was an English politician.

He was a Member (MP) of the Parliament of England for Westmorland in 1401.

References

14th-century births
1440 deaths
English MPs 1401
People from Westmorland